Salinibacterium amurskyense is a Gram-positive, non-motile, aerobic, non-spore-forming, irregular, rod-shaped actinobacteria, the type species of its genus.

References

Further reading

External links 
LPSN

WORMS
Type strain of Salinibacterium amurskyense at BacDive -  the Bacterial Diversity Metadatabase

Microbacteriaceae
Bacteria described in 2003